The Grand Prix Velo Manavgat, formerly known as the Grand Prix Manavgat–Side, is a one-day road cycling race held annually since 2018. It is part of UCI Europe Tour in category 1.2. A women's edition has also been held since 2020.

Winners

Men

Women

References

Cycle races in Turkey
UCI Europe Tour races
2018 establishments in Turkey
Recurring sporting events established in 2018